The Aichi Hai (Japanese 愛知杯) is a Grade 3 horse race for Thoroughbred fillies and mares aged four and over, run in January over a distance of 2000 metres on turf at Chukyo Racecourse.

The Aichi Hai was first run in 1963 and has held Grade 3 status since 1984. The race was run at Kokura Racecourse in 1999, 2010 and 2011. The Aichi Hai was run in December until 2014 and was open to three-year-olds before being changed to its current date: the change meant that the race was not run in 2015. The race was open to both male and female horses up to 2003.

Winners since 2000

Earlier winners

 1984 - Kikuno Pegasus
 1985 - Long Quick
 1986 - Peter Hauler
 1987 - Peter Hauler
 1988 - Katsu Tokushin
 1989 - Great Monte
 1990 - White Arrow
 1991 - Yamanin Seattle
 1992 - Nuevo Tosho
 1993 - Homare Okan
 1994 - Tenzan Yutaka
 1995 - Sound Barrier
 1996 - Foundry Shori
 1997 - Sakura Expert
 1998 - Kanetoshi Governor
 1999 - Bamboo Mariachi

See also
 Horse racing in Japan
 List of Japanese flat horse races

References

Turf races in Japan